Friendship Free Library, also known as Pitt Memorial Library, is a historic library building located at Friendship in Allegany County, New York.  Constructed of yellow brick in 1912, and designed by Otis Dockstader of Elmira, the building is composed of a five- by two bay, one story main block, with a large four by four bay block to the rear. The building features Arts and Crafts style decorative elements. The entrance is sheltered by a monumental gabled  portico supported by four Corinthian columns.

It was listed on the National Register of Historic Places in 2008.

References

External links
Friendship Free Library Website 

Library buildings completed in 1912
Libraries on the National Register of Historic Places in New York (state)
Neoclassical architecture in New York (state)
Buildings and structures in Allegany County, New York
1912 establishments in New York (state)
National Register of Historic Places in Allegany County, New York